The World of Tosh is an animated series based on the Sune books by Anders Jacobsson and Sören Olsson, and produced by the animation studios Happy Life together with German EM.TV & Merchandising and Irish Magma Films, following Peter Gustafsson purchasing the rights for an animated version of Sune in 1995.

The series originally aired at Allram Eest tecknat in SVT between 26 January 2002 – 8 March 2003. It received huge popularity in Latin America. An English dub was produced and aired on Nickelodeon and Fox Kids in the UK.

Episodes
Inte onormalt normal (Not Abnormally Normal)
Den siste pojkscouten (The Lost Boy Scout)
Ingenting blir som man tänkt sig
Din röst i etern
Att angöra en pool (Pool Party)
Jag vill också vara en rockstjärna (The Backside Boys)
Kalla mig Sunée
Ett kvalfyllt val (Wonderful Mid-life)
Imse vimse spindel (Along Came a Spider)
Den mystiska pussen (Mystery Lips)
Buss på vilovägar (The Bus Stops Here)
Elementärt, min käre Sune (Elementary, My Dear Tosh)
Min sköna kleptoman
Mitt liv som Sunes hund. (Puppy Love)
Dum, dummare, dummast
Livet är en picknick (Take Your Picnic)
Flaskposten (Message in a Bottle)
Söta Fröken Fräken (Accept No Substitute)
Sämst på att vara värst (Not Good at Being Bad)
Hellre ensam hemma (Home Not Alone)
Sune i klistret (You've Got Male)
Vita lögner (The Boy Who Coughed Wolf)
Kärlek och gamla sopor
Trassel på nätet 
I nöd och lust 
Nya grannar (Good Neighbour Riddance)

Video
In 2003-2004, the series was released to video, both DVD and VHS.

References

External links
 

2002 Swedish television series debuts
2003 Swedish television series endings
Swedish animated television series
2002 German television series debuts
2003 German television series endings
German children's animated comedy television series
2002 Irish television series debuts
2003 Irish television series endings
Irish children's animated comedy television series
2000s Swedish television series
2000s animated television series
Animated television series about children